Ryōka, Ryoka or Ryouka (written: 涼香 or 涼花) is a feminine Japanese given name. Notable people with the name include:

 (born 1972), Japanese voice actress
 (born 1974), Japanese voice actress
 (born 1998), Japanese actress and former singer

Japanese feminine given names